Glaucarubin is a quassinoid derived from the tropical shrub, Simarouba glauca. It is used as an antiamoebic agent.

Structure and properties
Glaucarubin is a bitter lactone found in Simaruba glauca. The compound is an acidic amino acid transporter, which is potassium-dependent and is often found in neuronal tissue.

Uses in medicine
Glaucarubin has been tested for the treatment of amebiasis, an infection of the intestines caused by Entamoeba histolytica. In one clinical trial, cure-rates of around 70% were observed, with few side-effects. In a clinical trial comparing various treatment options for intestinal amoebiasis, patients treated with glaucarubin had a relapse rate of 12%, four times the rate of those treated with emetine–bismuth iodide.

Toxicity
Being a cytotoxin, glaucarubin is capable of killing cells, which is why it has been tested as an anti-cancer drug. Although it helps in the process of killing the uncontrollable cancer cells, it has the tendency to spread and cause harm to unwanted parts of the body, such as the lymphatic system or the blood stream.

References

Heterocyclic compounds with 5 rings
Oxygen heterocycles
Esters
Lactones
Triterpenes